Passionate Friends may refer to:

 The Passionate Friends: A Novel, 1913 story by H.G. Wells
 The Passionate Friends (1922 film), a 1922 British film directed by Maurice Elvey, based on the novel
 The Passionate Friends (1949 film), a 1949 British film directed by David Lean, also based on the novel
 Passionate Friends (band)